Ilan Boaron (born May 3, 1972) is a former Israeli footballer.

Honours
Israeli Premier League
Runner-up (1): 1996-97
Toto Cup
Winner (1): 2000-01

References

External links
 
 

1972 births
Living people
Israeli footballers
Maccabi Netanya F.C. players
Hapoel Petah Tikva F.C. players
Hapoel Haifa F.C. players
Hakoah Maccabi Ramat Gan F.C. players
Hapoel Be'er Sheva F.C. players
Hapoel Nir Ramat HaSharon F.C. players
Footballers from Netanya
Israeli Premier League players
Liga Leumit players
Association football defenders